George Alexander Marshall (September 14, 1851 – April 21, 1899) was an American lawyer and politician who served as a one-term U.S. Representative from Ohio from 1897 to 1899.

Early life and career 
Born near Sidney, Ohio, Marshall attended the public schools of Shelby County, Ohio, and Ohio Wesleyan University, Delaware, Ohio.
He studied law.

In 1872 he married Mary Caroline Cowan, the daughter of Wilson V. Cowan, a local physician. She died in 1874 while giving birth to their first child. 

He was admitted to the bar in 1876 and commenced practice in Sidney, Ohio.

On December 8, 1880, he married Lucinda Frazer Cowan, Mary Caroline's youngest sister.
He served as prosecuting attorney of Shelby County for eight years, being elected in 1878, 1880, and 1883.

Congress 
Marshall was elected as a Democrat to the Fifty-fifth Congress (March 4, 1897 – March 3, 1899).
He was not a candidate for reelection in 1898.

Death
He died in Sidney, Ohio, April 21, 1899.
He was interred in Presbyterian Cemetery, Hardin, Ohio.

Sources

1851 births
1899 deaths
People from Sidney, Ohio
Ohio Wesleyan University alumni
County district attorneys in Ohio
19th-century American politicians
Democratic Party members of the United States House of Representatives from Ohio